Megalacron is a genus of air-breathing land snails, terrestrial pulmonate gastropod mollusks in the subfamily Hadrinae of the family Camaenidae.

Species
Species within the genus Megalacron include:
 Megalacron admiralitatis (I. Rensch, 1931)
 Megalacron alfredi (Cox, 1871)
 Megalacron ambrosia (Angas, 1868)
 Megalacron bequaerti Clench & Turner, 1964
 Megalacron boivini (Petit de la Saussaye, 1841)
 Megalacron boyerii (P. Fischer & Bernardi, 1857)
 Megalacron coniformis (Férussac, 1821)
 Megalacron coxiana (Angas, 1868)
 Megalacron densestriata (Fulton, 1902)
 Megalacron isabellae (Jaeckel & Schlesch, 1952)
 Megalacron juttingae Clench & Turner, 1964
 Megalacron klaarwateri (I. Rensch, 1931)
 Megalacron lambei (Pfeiffer, 1856)
 Megalacron lufensis (Thiele, 1928)
 Megalacron macfarlanei (Cox, 1873)
 Megalacron melanesia Clench & Turner, 1964
 Megalacron migratoria (Pfeiffer, 1855)
 Megalacron novaegeorgiensis (Cox, 1870)
 Megalacron periwonensis (Dell, 1955)
 Megalacron phaeostoma (Pfeiffer, 1877)
 Megalacron sellersi (Cox, 1872)
 Megalacron spadicea (Fulton, 1902)
 Megalacron tabarensis (I. Rensch, 1933)
 Megalacron tizianoi Delsaerdt, 2016
Species brought into synonymy
 Megalacron huberi Thach, 2017: synonym of Chloritis khammouanensis Inkhavilay & Panha, 2019 (secondary junior homonym of Chloritis huberi Thach, 2016; Chloritis khammouanensis is a replacement name)

References

 Rensch, I. (1934). Systematische und tiergeographische Untersuchungen über die Landschneckenfauna des Bismarck-Archipels I. Archiv für Naturgeschichte, Neue Folgen. 3: 445-488
 Bank, R. A. (2017). Classification of the Recent terrestrial Gastropoda of the World. Last update: July 16th, 2017.

External links
 

Camaenidae